Lodderstedt is an abandoned village in the German Mandfeld-Südharz rural district. It is located lakeside of Lodderstedt, 2.5 kilometers northwest of the town Gerbstedt.

Name

The town name; 'Lodderstedt', means home of Lothar.

History
The village is thought to have been founded around 500 AD.
Lodderstedt is thought to have been destroyed in the Halberstadt Bishop's Feud.
Around 1390, it was officially recorded that Loderstede was an abandoned village.
In 1560, the church was partially destroyed.

Bibliography
Erich Neuß: „Wanderungen durch die Grafschaft Mansfeld“; Band 3, Im Herzen der Grafschaft . fliegenkopf verlag, Halle (Saale), 2001 (written in German)

Gerbstedt